God Needs Men (French: Dieu a besoin des hommes) is a 1950 French historical drama film directed by Jean Delannoy and starring Pierre Fresnay, Madeleine Robinson and Daniel Gélin. The film is based on a 1944 novel Un recteur de l'Île de Sein by Henri Queffelec. It was shot at the Billancourt Studios in Paris. Location shooting took place on the Île de Sein off Finistère in Brittany. The film's sets were designed by the art director René Renoux.

It was originally due to be the French entry at the 1950 Venice Film Festival but it was withdrawn due to fears that its subject might offend the Catholic Church. However, due to its popularity, including amongst Catholics, it was accepted for screening at the Festival anyway. At the 1951 Berlin Film Festival it won the Special Prize for an Excellent Film Achievement.

Plot
On a rugged, poverty stricken island off the coast of Brittany many of the inhabitants spend their time as  wreckers preying on shipwrecks. Their wildness forces the parish priest to take refuge on the mainland. A fisherman steps forwards to take his place and tries to uphold religion on the island.

Cast
 Pierre Fresnay as Thomas Gourvennec
 Madeleine Robinson as Jeanne Gourvennec
 Daniel Gélin as Joseph le Berre
 Antoine Balpêtré as Le père Gourvennec, un pêcheur
 Germaine Kerjean as Mme Kerneis
 Sylvie as  Coise Karbacen
 Jean d'Yd as Corentin Gourvennec
 Daniel Ivernel as François Guillen
 Raphaël Patorni as Jules
 Lucienne Bogaert as Anaïs Le Berre
 Marcel Delaître as M. Kerneis
 Fernand René as Yves Lannuzel
 Charles Bouillaud as Le gendarme
 René Génin as Le père d'Yvon
 Jean Brochard as L'abbé Kerhervé, le recteur de Lescoff
 Jean Carmet as Yvon
 Andrée Clément as Scholastique Kerneis
 Marcelle Géniat as La mère Gourvennec
 Jérôme Goulven as Le brigadier
 Cécyl Marcyl as La vieille
 Albert Michel as Le Bail
 Jean-Pierre Mocky as Pierre
 Pierre Moncorbier as Un pêcheur

References

Bibliography
Johnson, William Bruce. Miracles & Sacrilege: Roberto Rossellini, the Church and Film Censorship in Hollywood. University of Toronto Press, 2008.

External links

1950 films
1950s historical drama films
French historical drama films
1950s French-language films
Films directed by Jean Delannoy
French black-and-white films
Films with screenplays by Jean Aurenche
Films with screenplays by Pierre Bost
Films shot at Billancourt Studios
Films set in Brittany
Films set in the 1850s
1950s French films